Alberto Chicote del Olmo (born 23 June 1969 in Madrid), is a cook, chef, restaurateur and famous Spanish TV host known for mixing traditional cuisine with new technologies and to be the pioneer of what is known as fusion cuisine in Spain; it consists of applying techniques and foreign products, mainly Asian, to the Spanish cuisine. He makes frequent appearances at conferences in gastronomy (some as Madrid Fusion), as well as presentations, demonstrations and master classes around the world. As a TV host he has a great success with the Spanish adaptation of the show Kitchen Nightmares titled Pesadilla en la cocina and Top Chef produced by Boomerang TV to Antena 3.

Biography
At the age of 17, Chicote joined Escuela de hostelería de Madrid in Casa de Campo Spain. During the nineties he worked in the kitchens of some famous restaurants of the time as Lucullus with Ange Garcia, Toni Sibaris Vicente and La Recoleta with Bethlehem Laguía. After his apprenticeship in Switzerland he had the opportunity to meet Salvador Gallego who greatly influenced his cooking knowledge. For the next four years, he worked as the Chef of El Cenachero where he strengthened his career by making a new kind of Andalusian cuisine that earned him recognition and success.

In 1987 he became the chef of the restaurant called NODE Benjamin Streets, with the aim of merging the Spanish cuisine with the Japanese cuisine. This project made him a pioneer of this type of cuisine in Spain. In 2006, he also began working as chef in the restaurant Pandelujo (same owner), a local with marked taste for aesthetics, where he mixed spaces and gastronomy, coordinating his position of executive chef of both restaurants. For a time he was responsible for the food section of the Sunday magazine of El País. He also held for three years a section devoted to cuisine in the radio program of Toni Garrido in RNE known as Asuntos propios and multiple collaborations in the Media sector.

Since 2012 he has been working as a TV presenter of Pesadilla en la cocina in laSexta. That year he was chosen by laSexta to present the 2013 chimes of New Year, with Sandra Sabates.  In addition to Pesadilla en la cocina, he is the jury and presenter of the Spanish version of the talent show Top Chef on Antena 3. In 2014 he opened his own restaurant, the Yakitoro in Madrid.

Tv appearances
 Pesadilla en la cocina (2012–) laSexta 
 Top Chef (2013–) Antena 3 
 El precio de los alimentos (2015) laSexta

Awards 
He has received several awards such as:
  Chef of the Year  in Congress Madrid Fusion
 Chef of the Year 2006 by the AMER
 AURA Award, the most innovative chefs
 Chef of the restaurant in 2011 by World
 Madrid Fusion Award to the best artists of the decade.
 Best TV presenter TV rioja 
 2013 Nécora Award 2013 to gastroviajero character 
 2013 Qemos Award 
 2013 Festival Award for the program "Pesadilla en la cocina"

References

External links 

  

Living people
People from Madrid
Spanish chefs
Spanish television chefs
1969 births